Bączal Górny  is a village in the administrative district of Gmina Skołyszyn, within Jasło County, Subcarpathian Voivodeship, in south-eastern Poland.

The village has a population of 640.

Birthplace of Joseph Dzieglewicz, father of John Dingell Sr, and grandfather of John Dingell, both of whom served in the United States Congress.

Points of interest

References

Villages in Jasło County